Bruce H. McMillan (born April 15, 1935) was an American politician in the state of Wyoming. He served in the Wyoming House of Representatives as a member of the Republican Party. He attended the University of Wyoming and was a businessman in the agriculture industry.

References

1935 births
Living people
Republican Party members of the Wyoming House of Representatives
Businesspeople from Wyoming
University of Wyoming alumni
Politicians from Cheyenne, Wyoming